Oxalobacter aliiformigenes is a Gram negative, non-spore-forming, oxalate-degrading anaerobic bacterium that was first isolated from human fecal samples. O. aliiformigenes is believed to have roles in calcium oxalate kidney stone disease because of its unique ability to utilize oxalate as its primary carbon source.

Taxonomy 
Oxalobacter aliiformigenes was originally thought to be a subgroup of Oxalobacter formigenes based on fatty acid profile, 16S ribosomal RNA sequencing, and DNA probes specific to the oxc (oxalyl-CoA decarboxylase) gene and frc (formyl-CoA transferase).. However, full genomes were sequenced and based on average nucleotide identity calculation, digital DNA-DNA hybridization, and phylogenetic tree analyses, O. aliiformigenes was determined to be a distinct species.

Antibiotic resistance and susceptibility
Oxalobacter aliiformigenes demonstrates in vitro resistance to amoxicillin, ampicillin, ceftriaxone, cephalexin, streptomycin, and vancomycin; and in vitro sensitivity to clarithromycin, clindamycin, ciprofloxacin, doxycycline, gentamycin, and tetracycline.

Genome 
The genome of O. formigenes has been sequenced by multiple researchers and is revealed to be 2.2 – 2.4 Mb with a G+C content of 50.9 - 51.5%.

References 

Burkholderiales